Shimizu (written:  lit. "pure water") is the 18th most common Japanese surname. Notable people with the surname include:

, Japanese voice actress and singer
, Japanese gravure idol, actress and television personality
, Japanese manga artist
, Japanese voice actor
, Japanese tennis player
, Japanese photographer
Dave Shimizu, Guamanian politician
, Japanese curler
, Japanese fencer
, Japanese actress and gravure idol
Hide Hyodo Shimizu (1908–1999), Japanese-Canadian educator and activist
, Japanese footballer and manager
, Japanese mathematician
, Japanese darts player
, Japanese ten-pin bowler
, Japanese film director
, Japanese speed skater
, Japanese musician and composer
, Japanese shogi player
, Japanese classical composer
Jenny Shimizu (born 1967), American model and actress
, Japanese yakuza boss
, Japanese footballer
, Japanese voice actress
, Japanese actor
, Japanese footballer
, Japanese footballer
, Japanese sport wrestler
, Japanese futsal player
, Japanese swimmer
, Japanese footballer
, Japanese footballer
, Japanese AV actor
, Japanese kickboxer
, Japanese aikidoka
, Japanese footballer
, Japanese actor and singer
Keto Shimizu (born 1984), American television and comic book writer
, Japanese footballer
, Japanese mixed martial artist
, Japanese footballer
, Japanese cross-country skier
, Japanese surgeon and politician
, Japanese long-distance runner
, Japanese actor
, Japanese hurdler
, Japanese footballer
, Japanese volleyball player
, Japanese playwright
, Japanese women's footballer
, Japanese motorcycle racer
, Japanese baseball player
, Japanese actor
, Japanese chief executive
, Japanese rower
, Japanese baseball player
, Japanese politician
, Japanese long-distance runner
, Japanese tarento, comedian and actress
, Japanese field hockey player
, Japanese actress
, Imperial Japanese Navy admiral
, Japanese cyclist
, Japanese child actress
, Japanese professional wrestler
, Japanese writer and poet
, Japanese samurai
, Japanese footballer
, Japanese baseball player
, Japanese footballer
, Japanese badminton player
, Japanese manga artist
, Japanese ski jumper
, Japanese actress and voice actress
, Japanese football player
Ryosuke Shimizu (born 1980), Japanese karateka
, Japanese actor and impressionist
, Japanese footballer
, Japanese singer
, Japanese swimmer
, pen name of Shugoro Yamamoto, Japanese writer
, Japanese boxer
, Japanese speed skater
, Japanese politician
, Japanese writer
, Japanese basketball player
, pen name of Shimizu Toyoko, Japanese writer and activist
, Japanese footballer
, Japanese musician and singer-songwriter
, Japanese mixed martial artist
, Japanese subtitler and translator
, Japanese communist politician
, Japanese footballer
Takaji Shimizu, Japanese jojutsuka
, Japanese film director
, Japanese baseball player
, Japanese baseball player
, Japanese politician
, Japanese footballer
, Japanese baseball player
, Japanese curler
, Japanese banker
, Japanese photographer
, Japanese boxer
, Japanese painter
, Japanese voice actor
, Japanese general
, Japanese composer, producer and saxophonist
, Japanese speed skater
, Japanese educator and Christian missionary
, Japanese water polo player
, Japanese writer
, Japanese basketball player, coach and executive
, Japanese curler
, Japanese astronomer
, Japanese speed skater
, Japanese manga artist
, Japanese designer and creator of Hello Kitty
, Japanese actress and gravure idol
, Japanese illustrator
, Japanese baseball player
, Japanese water polo player
, Japanese tennis player

Fictional characters
, a character in the novel Battle Royale
, a character in the video game series La Corda d'Oro
, a character in the manga series Haikyū!!
, a character in the novel Shiki
, a character in the manga series Chobits
, a member of the unit "Peaky P-Key" in the anime franchise D4DJ.

References

Japanese-language surnames